Rocca al Mare Shopping Centre is a shopping centre designed by architect Meeli Truu in Tallinn, Estonia. It's situated in the Haabersti District's subdistrict of Haabersti. Rocca al Mare is the third largest shopping centre in Estonia, with a gross leasable area of  containing nearly 170 different shops (including 14 restaurants and cafés), free of charge dressing room, and more than 1300 parking spaces.

The shopping centre has three floors, with the shops and other commercial services on the first and second floors. The third floor is reserved for parking. The biggest shops in the centre are Prisma, H&M, Marks and Spencer, Euronics, Reserved, and Rademar.

Rocca al Mare Centre opened its doors in 1998, being the first and biggest of its kind in Estonia. In 2005 Citycon Oyj (a company specialized on shopping centres' development and management) acquired Rocca al Mare Centre. Citycon Oyj's development began on 1 October 2008 when Rocca al Mare's first refreshed section was opened. In May 2009, a completely renovated fashion section in the left wing was opened, which offers a wide range of international and domestic brands. There are hundreds of brands represented in the centre, many of which have the only representative in Estonia located in the Rocca al Mare shopping centre.

References

External links

1998 establishments in Estonia
Buildings and structures in Tallinn
Shopping centres in Estonia
Shopping malls established in 1998
Tourist attractions in Tallinn